Tourist History is the debut studio album by Northern Irish indie rock band Two Door Cinema Club, released on 17 February 2010 by Kitsuné. The album is named for the reputation of the band's hometown, Bangor, as a tourist attraction.

Tourist History won the Choice Music Prize for the 2010 Irish Album of the Year. The band said it was the first award they had ever won and donated the €10,000 prize money to charity.

Recording
The band recorded the album at Eastcote Studios in London with Eliot James in July 2009, and was based in a studio adjacent to Duran Duran. The album was mixed at Phillipe Zdar's newly built studio, Motorbass, in Paris. Two Door Cinema Club were the second band to use Zdar's studio, the first being Phoenix, who recorded the Grammy Award-winning album Wolfgang Amadeus Phoenix. During the mixing process, Zdar reportedly found it hard to understand the band's Irish accents over the first couple of days. Of working with Two Door Cinema Club, Zdar said to NME, "Their stuff was already tight—I was just able to give big bass, big highs and something a bit large! They are completely crazy about music—there is not one hour when they don't listen or download something from a blog. They remind me of me when I was a teenager." The album was mastered by Mike Marsh at the Exchange in London.

Critical reception

Tourist History received generally positive reviews from music critics. At Metacritic, which assigns a normalised rating out of 100 to reviews from mainstream publications, the album received an average score of 67, based on 12 reviews. Lou Thomas of BBC Music described the album as showing "sporadic flashes of greatness", comparing the album to the works of Editors, Foals, and the Futureheads, whilst Laura Silverman of The Times described the album as "an excited burst of short, simple indie pop songs driven by jangly guitars and punk rhythms". Dom Gourlay of Drowned in Sound described the album as "mixing Bloc Party's guile and wisdom with a pop sensibility not normally associated with modern-day guitar oriented bands" and as a "more accessible and less po-faced Antidotes".

Commercial performance
Tourist History debuted at number 46 on the UK Albums Chart with first-week sales of 5,071 copies, eventually peaking 62 weeks later at number 24, in May 2011. The album was certified platinum by the British Phonographic Industry (BPI) on 22 July 2013, and had sold 340,542 copies in the United Kingdom as of November 2016.

Track listing

Personnel
Credits adapted from the liner notes of Tourist History.

 Eliot James – recording, production ; mixing 
 Philippe Zdar – mixing 
 Mike Marsh – mastering
 Tal Amiran – additional drumming
 Ben Dawson – trumpet 
 Heather McCormick – backing vocals 
 Anthea Humphreys – backing vocals 
 Mathieu Meyer – design

Charts

Weekly charts

Year-end charts

Certifications

Release history

References

2010 debut albums
Choice Music Prize-winning albums
Glassnote Records albums
Two Door Cinema Club albums